Jia Dorene Perkins (born February 23, 1982) is an American retired professional basketball player. She announced her retirement after the 2017 season when the Lynx won the WNBA championship. She was born in Newburgh, New York. She moved to Granbury, Texas, where she attended Granbury High School.

College career

College statistics
Source

2000–2001
Jia helped Texas Tech to get to March Madness, as Texas Tech claimed the 2nd seed. Texas Tech went all the way to the regional semifinals, beating 15th seeded Penn State and 7th seeded Virginia Tech. However, in the regional semifinals, Texas Tech lost 74-72 to Purdue, who went all the way to the National Championship before losing to Notre Dame.

2001–2002
Despite being seeded in a lesser position, Texas Tech still managed to surge their way through to the Sweet Sixteen round again as the 4th seed team in the West Region's bracket. Texas tech beat 13th seeded Stephen F. Austin in the 1st round, then went on to beat 12th seeded Mississippi State. However, Texas Tech came to the same end as they did in 2001, losing by 10 points to 1st-seeded Oklahoma, who also went on to lose in the Championship.

2002–2003
Texas Tech looked to overcome their Sweet Sixteen losing streak, and this year they were the 2nd-seeded team again. Texas Tech started off a bit shaky, beating 15th-seeded Missouri State by only 8 points. However, they redeemed themselves in the 2nd round, winning 71-48 over UC Santa Barbara. They went on to beat New Mexico by the same score, advancing to the Elite Eight for the first (and last) time in Jia's college era. Texas Tech went on to lose to Duke.

2003–2004
In Jia's last year at Texas Tech, Jia played her fewest ever games in her college career, only playing 16 total games. That being said, Texas Tech also was eliminated in the earliest stage of Jia's college career. Texas Tech finished 4th seeded again, and beat Maine in the 1st round. They went on to lose by 17 points to Louisiana Tech. Jia never did go to the Final Four tournament.

WNBA career
Perkins was selected by the Charlotte Sting with the 35th pick in the 2004 WNBA Draft. Perkins missed most of the season due to the birth of her daughter.

On November 16, 2005, Perkins was selected by the Chicago Sky in the expansion draft. She played in Chicago for five years and posted a career-best 17.0 points per game in 2008.

In 2009, Perkins was named to the Eastern Conference All-Star team as a reserve.

Prior to the 2011 season, she was traded to the San Antonio Stars in exchange for Michelle Snow. That same year, Perkins made her first playoff appearance.

During the 2016 WNBA Draft, Perkins was traded to the Minnesota Lynx in exchange for Jazmon Gwathmey.

In February 2018, it was announced that Perkins had officially retired from the game of basketball.

WNBA playoffs

The Silver Stars qualified for the 2011 WNBA Playoffs and Perkins made her first career postseason appearance in 2011, where the Stars lost in the first round to the Minnesota Lynx. Perkins scored the team's high of 24 points in the 2nd game of the series, played in San Antonio, where the Stars won 84-75.

The next year, the Stars made the 2012 WNBA Playoffs, where the Stars improved to the third seeded spot. However, their season came to an early end as the Los Angeles Sparks defeated them 2-0 in the 1st round.

The Stars missed the playoffs in 2013, but came back in 2014 as the third seed. However, they met the same sticky end that they did in 2012, losing 2-0 to the Lynx. Perkins has played in every playoff game the Stars have partaken in since 2011.

In her first season with the Lynx, they made it all the way to the WNBA Finals where the faced the Sparks. However, they Lynx ended up losing the series 2-3.

In her second season with the Lynx, they made it back to the Finals for the third straight season. This time the Lynx would win in 5 games against the Sparks, winning their fourth championship in seven seasons, tying the now-defunct Houston Comets for most championship titles.

WNBA career statistics

Source

Regular season

|-
| style="text-align:left;"| 2004
| style="text-align:left;"| Charlotte
| 4 || 0 || 4.3 || .000 || .000 || .750 || 0.8 || 0.3 || 0.8 || 0.0 || 0.2 || 0.8
|-
| style="text-align:left;"| 2005
| style="text-align:left;"| Charlotte
| 30 || 11 || 15.5 || .424 || .333 || .633 || 1.5 || 1.1 || 1.0 || 0.3 || 1.0 || 5.0
|-
| style="text-align:left;"| 2006
| style="text-align:left;"| Chicago
| 30 || 27 || 28.0 || .351 || .277 || .806 || 3.6 || 3.2 || 1.4 || 0.4 || 1.8 || 9.4
|-
| style="text-align:left;"| 2007
| style="text-align:left;"| Chicago
| 33 || 5 || 23.1 || .464 || .433 || .774 || 3.3 || 2.3 || 1.5 || 0.2 || 1.5 || 11.7
|-
| style="text-align:left;"| 2008
| style="text-align:left;"| Chicago
| 34 || 34 || 31.9 || .436 || .363 || .891 || 4.0 || 2.8 || 1.9 || 0.3 || 1.7 || 17.0
|-
| style="text-align:left;"| 2009
| style="text-align:left;"| Chicago
| 34 || 34 || 27.4 || .417 || .385 || .846 || 3.4 || 2.9 || 2.2 || 0.2 || 1.6 || 13.2
|-
| style="text-align:left;"| 2010
| style="text-align:left;"| Chicago
| 34 || 34 || 27.5 || .396 || .349 || .814 || 2.9 || 2.4 || 1.6 || 0.2 || 1.1 || 10.7
|-
| style="text-align:left;"| 2011
| style="text-align:left;"| San Antonio
| 34 || 8 || 25.1 || .418 || .313 || .845 || 3.5 || 1.4 || 1.2 || 0.2 || 1.0 || 12.0
|-
| style="text-align:left;"| 2012
| style="text-align:left;"| San Antonio
| 33 || 3 || 23.0 || .380 || .386 || .754 || 2.8 || 1.9 || 1.6 || 0.3 || 0.8 || 10.6
|-
| style="text-align:left;"| 2013
| style="text-align:left;"| San Antonio
| 34 || 33 || 30.5 || .400 || .388 || .865 || 3.1 || 2.0 || 2.3 || 0.2 || 1.4 || 13.9
|-
| style="text-align:left;"| 2014
| style="text-align:left;"| San Antonio
| 23 || 2 || 22.6 || .442 || .411 || .895 || 2.3 || 1.7 || 1.4 || 0.2 || 0.9 || 12.5
|-
| style="text-align:left;"| 2015
| style="text-align:left;"| San Antonio
| 26 || 26 || 27.3 || .376 || .272 || .880 || 3.0 || 1.7 || 1.4 || 0.3 || 1.2 || 13.3
|-
| style="text-align:left;"| 2016
| style="text-align:left;"| Minnesota
| 34 || 5 || 20.7 || .366 || .228 || .833 || 2.6 || 1.3 || 0.9 || 0.2 || 0.6 || 6.4
|-
|style="text-align:left;background:#afe6ba;"| 2017†
| style="text-align:left;"| Minnesota
| 34 || 2 || 16.3 || .369 || .316 || .833 || 2.0 || 1.4 || 1.0 || 0.0 || 0.8 || 4.2
|-
| style="text-align:left;"| Career
| style="text-align:left;"| 14 years, 4 teams
| 417 || 224 || 24.4 || .405 || .351 || .834 || 2.9 || 2.0 || 1.5 || 0.2 || 1.2 || 10.6

Postseason

|-
| style="text-align:left;"| 2011
| style="text-align:left;"| San Antonio
| 3 || 3 || 33.7 || .395 || .368 || 1.000 || 5.3 || 2.7 || 2.7 || 0.3 || 2.3 || 13.0
|-
| style="text-align:left;"| 2012
| style="text-align:left;"| San Antonio
| 2 || 0 || 21.5 || .375 || .333 || .500 || 1.5 || 2.5 || 3.0 || 0.5 || 0.5 || 12.0
|-
| style="text-align:left;"| 2014
| style="text-align:left;"| San Antonio
| 2 || 0 || 23.0 || .625 || .600 || .500 || 1.0 || 0.5 || 0.5 || 0.5 || 1.0 || 12.0
|-
| style="text-align:left;"| 2016
| style="text-align:left;"| Minnesota
| 8 || 0 || 17.6 || .390 || .100 || 1.000 || 2.0 || 1.9 || 0.5 || 0.1 || 0.3 || 5.1
|-
|style="text-align:left;background:#afe6ba;"| 2017†
| style="text-align:left;"| Minnesota
| 8 || 0 || 15.8 || .333 || .286 || 1.000 || 2.0 || 0.9 || 0.7 || 0.1 || 0.6 || 3.3
|-
| style="text-align:left;"| Career
| style="text-align:left;"|5 years, 2 teams
| 23 || 3 || 19.9 || .403 || .316 || .800 || 2.3 || 1.6 || 1.3 || 0.2 || 0.7 || 6.7

Awards and achievements
 
 2009 WNBA All-Star Selection
 Stars All-Decade Team All-Decade Team

References

External links

 
 Texas Tech Lady Raiders bio

1982 births
Living people
American expatriate basketball people in Israel
American expatriate basketball people in Turkey
American women's basketball players
Basketball players from Texas
Charlotte Sting players
Chicago Sky players
Galatasaray S.K. (women's basketball) players
Minnesota Lynx players
People from Granbury, Texas
San Antonio Stars players
Shooting guards
Sportspeople from Newburgh, New York
Texas Tech Lady Raiders basketball players
Women's National Basketball Association All-Stars